Nigel Williams (born 20 January 1948) is an English novelist, screenwriter and playwright.

Biography
Williams was born in Cheadle, Cheshire.  He was educated at Highgate School, north London and Oriel College, Oxford, is married with three sons and lives in Putney, southwest London. After graduating from Oxford, Williams joined the BBC as a general trainee, and worked as an arts producer for the corporation eventually becoming the editor of Omnibus and Bookmark.

His first novel My Life Closed Twice won the 1978 Somerset Maugham Award. For his screen adaptation of William Horwood's Skallagrigg (1994) he won a television BAFTA. Williams was also the primary scriptwriter for the second season – based on Greek myths – of the acclaimed Jim Henson's Storyteller series.

Williams' most successful work has been the 2005 TV drama Elizabeth I, being himself nominated for an Emmy Award for his script and winning multiple awards for the film and its star, Helen Mirren.

Bibliography

Novels
1977 – My Life Closed Twice (Secker & Warburg)
1980 – Jack Be Nimble (Secker & Warburg)
1983 – Johnny Jarvis (Penguin, based on his teleplay)
1984 – Charlie (Methuen, based on his teleplay)
1985 – Star Turn (Faber & Faber)
1987 – Witchcraft, (Faber & Faber)
1988 – Black Magic (Hutchinson Novella)
1988 – Breaking Up (Faber & Faber, based on his teleplay)
1989 – Buttons in the Marsh (Faber & Faber, based on his stageplay)
The Wimbledon Trilogy :
1990 – The Wimbledon Poisoner (Faber & Faber)
1992 – They Came from SW19 (Faber & Faber)
1993 – East of Wimbledon (Faber & Faber)
1994 – Scenes from a Poisoner's Life (Faber & Faber)
1997 – Stalking Fiona (Granta)
1999 – Fortysomething (Penguin)
2002 – Hatchett & Lycett (Penguin)
2013 – Unfaithfully Yours (Corsair)
2016 – Waking Up Dead

Plays
1974 – Marbles (Bush Theatre)
1976 – Square One
1976 – Double Talk (London)
1977 – Snowwhite Washes Whiter and Deadwood (Bristol)
1978 – Class Enemy (Royal Court Theatre)
1979 – Easy Street (Bristol)
1980 – Line 'em (Cottesloe Theatre)
1980 – Sugar and Spice (Royal Court)
1980 – Trial Run (Playhouse, Oxford)
1982 – The Adventures of Jasper Ridley (Hull)
1982 – W.C.P.C. (Half Moon Theatre)
1985 – My Brother's Keeper (Greenwich)
1985 – Deathwatch (Birmingham Rep)
1986 – Country Dancing (Other Place Theatre, RSC)
1987 – As it Was (Edinburgh)
1988 – Consequences (Croydon)
1988 – Breaking up
1989 – Buttons in the Marsh (Cheltenham Festivals)
1989 – Nativity (Tricycle Theatre)
1995 – Lord of the Flies (adaption) (Other Place)
1996 – The Last Romantics (Greenwich)
1996 – Harry and Me (Royal Court)
2008 – MyFace (Cottesloe Theatre)
2009 – HR (five series comedy drama for BBC Radio 4)

Non-fiction
1993 – Two and a Half Men in a Boat (Hodder and Stoughton)
1995 – From Wimbledon to Waco'' (Faber & Faber)

References

External links
 
Stalking Fiona on Granta website
Nigel Williams and 'The Wimbledon Poisoner' article on the London Fictions website

1948 births
Living people
20th-century English novelists
21st-century British novelists
Alumni of Oriel College, Oxford
English dramatists and playwrights
English humorists
Fellows of the Royal Society of Literature
People educated at Highgate School
People from Cheadle, Greater Manchester
English male dramatists and playwrights
English male novelists
20th-century English male writers
21st-century English male writers